Premamayi is a 1966 Indian Kannada-language film, directed by M. R. Vittal and produced by Srikanth Nahatha and Srikanth Patel. The film stars Rajkumar, K. S. Ashwath, Leelavathi and Jayanthi. The film has musical score by R. Sudarshanam. This is the only movie where Leelavathi played the role of Rajkumar's sister-in-law. The movie is an official adaptation of the National Award winning 1964 Malayalam movie Kudumbini.

This was singer K. J. Yesudas's second movie which had Rajkumar in the lead role - the  first one being Ondaguva Mundaguva from Chandavalliya Thota (1964) which however was not picturized on Rajkumar. Thus, this became the only movie where Rajkumar lip synced to Yesudas' voice who sang two songs in the movie - Too Too Too Bedappa and Henne Ninna Kannanota. The movie is also noticeable for not having any songs by P.B. Sreenivas.

Cast

Rajkumar as Madhu
K. S. Ashwath as Raghavaiah
Leelavathi as Lakshmi
Jayanthi as Janu
B. Jayamma
B. Jaya
B. V. Radha
R. T. Rama as Sharada
Prashanth (credited as Baby Prashanth)
Arun Kumar
Ranga
Dikki Madhava Rao
Makeup Subbanna
B. Raghavendra Rao
Kuppuraj
Basavaraj (credited as Master Basavaraj)

Soundtrack
The music was composed by R. Sudarsanam.

References

External links
 

1966 films
1960s Kannada-language films
Films directed by M. R. Vittal